Bang Dae-Jong (born 28 January 1985) is a South Korean football defender. He currently plays for the FC Anyang in the K League 2, having previously played for Daegu FC.

Club career
Bang is a draftee from Dong-A University, joining Daegu FC for the 2008 season.  Making only intermittent appearances during 2008, he was more successful during the 2009 season, playing most of the games of the regular K-League season.  He was made captain of the senior squad for the 2010 season. On 4 January 2011, Bang transferred to Chunnam Dragons.

Club career statistics

External links

1985 births
Living people
Association football defenders
South Korean footballers
Daegu FC players
Jeonnam Dragons players
Gimcheon Sangmu FC players
FC Anyang players
K League 1 players
K League 2 players